Ken W. Roberts (born 13 May 1952) is a former Australian rules footballer who played with Essendon and Melbourne in the Victorian Football League (VFL).

Roberts, the son of a Richmond player of the same name, was a utility. He started out in the Essendon Under 19s, after arriving to the club from Essendon Baptists-St John's. In 1973 he kicked a career high 36 goals for the season, which ended prematurely with a knee injury. He finished his VFL career at Melbourne, where he played 12 senior games.

From 1980 to 1984, Roberts was captain-coach of the Lavington Football Club. He steered them to a premiership in 1983, their first in the Ovens & Murray Football League. In 1985 he captain-coached Queensland club Kedron.

References

1952 births
Australian rules footballers from Victoria (Australia)
Essendon Football Club players
Melbourne Football Club players
Kedron Football Club players
Lavington Football Club players
Living people